Burradoo railway station is located on the Main South line in New South Wales, Australia. It serves the town of Burradoo, opening in 1870.

Platforms & services
Burradoo has two side platforms. It is serviced by NSW TrainLink Southern Highlands Line services travelling between Campbelltown and Moss Vale with 2 weekend morning services to Sydney Central and limited evening services to Goulburn.

References

External links

Burradoo station details Transport for New South Wales

Railway stations in Australia opened in 1870
Regional railway stations in New South Wales
Short-platform railway stations in New South Wales, 2 cars
Main Southern railway line, New South Wales
Southern Highlands (New South Wales)
Burradoo, New South Wales